Chiheb Labidi (born 1 June 2001) is a Tunisian professional football player who plays for Club Africain.

Club career 
Chiheb Labidi made his professional debut for Club Africain on 28 April 2019, coming on as a substitute in the Ligue Pro 1 game against AS Gabès.

International career 
With Tunisia U20, Labidi reached the U20 CAN semifinals in 2021. He eventually was named in the best XI of the competition.

References

External links

2001 births
Living people
Tunisian footballers
Tunisia youth international footballers
Association football forwards
Club Africain players
Tunisian Ligue Professionnelle 1 players